Flat is a census-designated place (CDP) in Yukon-Koyukuk Census Area, Alaska, United States.  As of the 2010 Census, the population of the CDP was 0, down from 4 residents in 2000. Its post office closed in January 2004.

History 
Prospectors John Beaton and W.A. Dikeman discovered gold on Otter Creek on 25 December 1908.  News of the discovery spread slowly, but some miners arrived in the summer of 1909 and built a small camp they called Flat City.  More gold was discovered on nearby Flat Creek and more miners arrived in 1910.  Beaton, Peter Miscovich, Lars Ostnes, and David Strandberg were prominent early arrivals who mined successfully long after the initial "boomtown" faded.  By 1914, the community had grown to about 6,000 people, complete with an elementary school, a telephone system, two stores, a hotel, restaurant, pool hall, laundry and jail.  However, a fire started by the "Durand Café" in 1924 caused the majority of the town to burn, thus starting a decline. By 1930, the population had declined to 124.  No plat was filed for Flat, and the town site rests on mining claims, so the existence of Flat may contravene the law, but the U.S. Post Office acknowledged the community and served its few residents with an office until the year 2000.

Between 1986 and 2000, the primary year-round residents were a family of five who worked together to maintain the area in the winter for mining in the summer.

Wiley Post 1933 airplane crash
In July 1933, pioneering aviator Wiley Post undertook the first solo flight around the world. On July 20, en route to Fairbanks from a stop in Khabarovsk, Siberia, Post nosed over his high-wing, single-engine Lockheed Vega, the Winnie Mae, in Flat. Local residents helped him right the aircraft. The only damage was a broken propeller. A replacement propeller was brought to Flat by pioneer Alaska flier Joe Crosson and the airplane was repaired by John Miscovich.  Post continued to Fairbanks, then on to Edmonton and New York, completing his solo flight around the world in under 8 days. 50 years later, Miscovich constructed a monument  to commemorate Post's first solo flight around the world.

Geography 
Flat is located at  (62.454135, -158.008284), 7 miles southeast of Iditarod.

Climate

Demographics 

Flat first appeared on the 1920 U.S. Census as an unincorporated village. It would continue to appear until 1960. It did not appear again until 2000 when it was made a census designated place (CDP) with its boundaries including the former city of Iditarod and the former mining village of Otter. As of 2010, it has no residents.

Note that the population of 6,000 for 1914 during its peak year is speculative and not an official count by the U.S. Census Bureau.

2000 census
As of the census of 2000, there were 4 people in 1 household (a married couple with children, in this case) and in 1 family residing in the town.  The population density was 0.0 people per square mile (0.0/km2). There were 3 housing units at an average density of 0.0/sq mi (0.0/km2).  The racial makeup of the CDP was all white.

In the CDP, the population was evenly spread out over the age categories under-18, 18 to 24, 25 to 44 and from 45 to 64. The median age was 33 years. There were as many males as there were females, but apparently the only person below 18 was a girl.

2010 census
By the 2010 census, the population was 0.

See also
Iditarod, Alaska, the former river port for Flat
John Miscovich,  the "mayor of Flat", whose family acquired the claims of departing miners, eventually owning 1,400 acres of Otter Valley.

References

External links 
 Alaska Division of Community Advocacy - Community Information Summary 

Census-designated places in Alaska
Census-designated places in Unorganized Borough, Alaska
Census-designated places in Yukon–Koyukuk Census Area, Alaska
Ghost towns in Alaska
Ghost towns in the United States
Ghost towns in North America